Ruby Red is a 2013 German fantasy film based on the book with the same name by Kerstin Gier.

Cast 
 Maria Ehrich - Gwendolyn "Gwen" Shepherd
 Jannis Niewöhner - Gideon de Villiers
 Laura Berlin - Charlotte Montrose
 Veronica Ferres - Grace Shepherd
 Uwe Kockisch - Falk de Villiers
 Katharina Thalbach - Tante Maddy
 Gottfried John - Dr. White
 Josefine Preuß - Lucy Montrose
 Florian Bartholomäi - Paul de Villiers
 Johannes Silberschneider - Mr. Bernhard
 Gerlinde Locker - Lady Arista
 Axel Milberg - Lucas Montrose
 Jennifer Lotsi - Leslie Hay 
Philip Wiegratz - Gordon Gelderman

Plot summary 
The movie opens with a young man and woman being chased by a group of hooded men intent on killing them or taking a device that they are carrying. As they are surrounded, the man Paul reassures his companion that Gwendolyn will be safe, that Grace will protect her. Just as the men are about to kill them, Paul and the young woman activate the device and disappear in a swirl of energy.

We fast-forward sixteen years to the day before Gwendolyn "Gwen" Shepherd's sixteenth birthday. Gwen belongs to a very snobbish aristocratic London family. Most of the family members dress as if it were the nineteenth century, and they don't believe in associating with "commoners." This makes them look down at Gwen, because Gwen and her mother Grace and brother Nick are the only "normal" members of the family.

The family is gathered at her grandmother's London castle giving a party to honor Gwen's cousin Charlotte, who is one day older than her. The family has always regarded Charlotte as something very special, as she had inherited a genetic mutation that for some secret reason makes her extremely valuable. Gwen's great-aunt Maddy says that the gene is a hereditary ability to travel back in time, inherited by only one female per generation, but Maddy's obsession with the supernatural makes Gwen not take her information very seriously.

At the party, Charlotte is even more snooty than usual and taunts Gwen that she will never get a date for the school ball. Gwen is attracted to the über-handsome Gideon de Villiers, but he brushes her off and only has eyes for Charlotte. When Charlotte suddenly suffers from dizzy spells and everyone makes a big fuss about her. Charlotte's mother has her wrapped in a special dress and Gideon rushes her off to the mysterious secret society. Great-aunt Maddy tells Gwen more about the Order of Count Saint Germain and the time travel gene. Gideon apparently is a carrier of the same gene. Charlotte is inducted by the Guardians into the Order. They think she is the "Ruby," the long-prophesied last time traveler.

Shortly thereafter, Gwen also starts having fainting spells and begins seeing ghosts. She goes out to get some fresh air and literally stumbles into the nineteenth century. The only person she tells about this brief leap in time is her best friend Leslie, who quickly recognizes that Gwen must be the one who inherited the time travel gene, instead of Charlotte. Gwen makes several more uncontrolled leaps in time and begins to learn about a conflict between her family and the members of the Order. Gwen finally tells her mother Grace about her time travels, who recognizes that she is the Ruby and immediately brings her to the Order to get help in controlling her time travel.

There, Gwen is not believed. Her aunt, Charlotte's mother, thinks that this is a desperate attempt to be the center of attention, and the Order's guards, in turn, fear a conspiracy, since decades ago Grace helped the previous time travelers, Lucy and Paul, escape. But most importantly, Gideon de Villiers, the male gene carrier of her generation, also known as Diamond, clearly does not want to work with Gwendolyn because he and Charlotte are close and they have been training together for years for their mysterious "mission." Only Mr. George, a formerly close friend of her deceased grandfather, and Madame Rossini, who makes the authentic costumes for the planned time travel, are friendly and understanding toward her. Charlotte is also extremely upset about being replaced by Gwen.

Eventually it is confirmed that Gwen is the last of a total of twelve time travelers, the so-called Ruby. But Gwen has doubts about the Order and the mission and the Chronograph, with which the Order can control the time traveling of the twelve travelers. Apparently Lucy helped steal the Chronograph because she was afraid of a terrible power it held. Gwen still is unsure what exactly is going on, but at the Order, she is given an unlimited spending account, and Gideon is warned to keep an eye on Gwendolyn, and is also warned against any love affairs between the two time traveling families. Gwen overhears him say that she is definitely not his type.

Due to the theft of the previous chronograph by Gwen's cousin Lucy, blood samples have to be collected from all of the formerly living carriers to finish a second device. But Gideon was unable to collect blood from Lady Tilney, Gwen's great-great-grandmother, as she knows Gwendolyn's name and will only cooperate with Gwendolyn. When Gideon and Gwen visit Lady Tilney in 1912, Lucy and Paul suddenly appear, warning Gwendolyn of the dangers of finishing the Chronograph and of the Count's plans to sacrifice her life to achieve his goals. Gideon overpowers Paul and the butler and runs away with Gwen. Back in the 21st century, Gwen takes Gideon out to a "common" restaurant for some Indian food, which is a new experience for him.

Back at headquarters, only Gwendolyn believes in Lucy and Paul's sincerity, while the Guardians are convinced of a plot by the Florentine Alliance that has been fighting the Count of Saint Germain for centuries. Falk de Villiers, grandmaster of the lodge, wants to control Gwen and is worried about her curiosity, but Gideon starts having some twinges of doubt. Charlotte taunts Gwen with her close relationship with Gideon. Gwen breaks the Order's vows of secrecy and shares about her experiences with her friend Leslie. Charlotte recruits a teacher at the school, who is a secret member of the Order, to stop them. Gideon picks Gwen up at the school with a limo, which impresses her classmates.

Gwen goes to meet with the Count of Saint Germain in 1782. He is able to read minds but is not impressed with Gwen and will not answer her questions. The Count wonders what the Ruby's special magic is. Gwen does not know. When she talks about the future to his companions, he chokes her Darth Vader style and warns her not to break his rules. Gwen questions Gideon about his blind obedience to the Order even though he knows little about their goals.

On the way back, their carriage is attacked in Hyde Park. During the fight, Gwen saves Gideon's life, and he is forced to reevaluate how he sees her. Gwen wants to run away from the Order but Gideon says they can't because the Order "owns" them. Ultimately he decides to search with her for answers. He kisses her as thanks for saving his life, which Charlotte observes from a window.

At night, they sneak into the Order's archives to find an ancient prophecy about themselves, but the secret documents were transferred to a bank years ago. Using a note from Gwen's grandfather, they convince Mr. George to help them travel to 1942 to find the documents. In 1942, they read the prophecy about how Gwen's death as the Ruby (a.k.a. "the Raven"), bleeding out in the snow, will bring the circle of the twelve to completion. The last part of the prophecy is torn off and missing. Security guards break in, and in trying to escape, Gwen falls many stories to the ground from the top of the observatory tower. After being unconscious for some time in the snow-covered courtyard, Gwen wakes up in a pool of her own blood. The Count then comes in spirit form to confront her. Meanwhile, Gideon is thrown into the dungeon. The ghost of a little boy whom Gwen has been seeing throughout the movie appears and helps keep Gwen discover that Lucy's talisman she has been carrying is actually a key to help her get into the building and stay alive.

Again in the present, Gwen is found unconscious from hypothermia. Falk de Villiers quotes the prophecy of her icy death and tries to prevent any efforts to save her life. But Gideon defies this instruction and carries Gwen in the doctor's room. When she recovers, he promises her to always take care of her.

Gwendolyn goes to the big school ball wearing her cousin Lucy's dress and being accompanied by Gideon. She discovers from a family photo that the little boy she has been seeing is her grandfather's dead younger brother, and she concludes that her ability to see ghosts could be the special "magic of the raven." At the ball Gideon and Gwen share a kiss while a ghost dances nearby. The film concludes with Paul and Lucy escaping again from another group of men who are chasing them.

References

External links 
 
 

2013 films
German teen fantasy films
2010s teen fantasy films
2010s German-language films
Films based on German novels
Films about time travel
Films set in London
2010s German films